Corallonectria is a genus of ascomycete fungi in the family Nectriaceae.  Species of Corallonectria are Neotropical. These fungi are characterized by the formation of brightly colored rhizomorphs and of copulated synnematous fusarium-like asexual morphs in culture. The asexual morph in nature has been rarely observed (e.g. a specimen collection from Panama in Mushroom Observer). The sexual fruiting bodies are furfuraceous and usually seated at the base of a reddish synnemata. It is a monotypic genus containing the sole species Corallonectria jatrophae. This species was formerly classified under Corallomycetella.

References

External links

Nectriaceae genera
Monotypic Sordariomycetes genera